El Bocho (Little Donkey) is the Mexican nickname of a street artist from Spain, who works in Berlin.

Career
Spanish-born El Bocho, formally lived in Frankfurt, is a former illustrator and typographer, who has published his works in numerous newspapers, including Frankfurter Allgemeine, he now currently works as a graffiti artist, depicting many styles from the macabre to the romantic with giant cut-outs and installations, some up to 20 ft tall, which he hangs on Berlin's walls at night.

Aside from using canvas he has recently started working with tiles. His newest experiment involves exposing poster paper to sunlight and precipitation, then adding color, before leaving it outside again to mesh with the natural surroundings.

El Bocho always uses the same characters as stylistic elements. He works with the four figures Little Lucy, Kalle and Bernd, Tina Berlina and Citizen.

In 2003, El Bocho created a signature symbol, the Little Lucy doll, based on a 1970s Czech TV series, Lucy—Streets bugaboo. Lucy maltreats her cat, but the cat survives all the murder attempts. He developed this variant of the series himself. It bears witness to his black humour. 

In July 2009, El Bocho made eco-friendly bags.
(see also: website http://www.elbocho.net)

El Bocho also creates portraits of women he calls “Citizens.”

Gallery of the character "Little Lucy"

General Gallery

Exhibitions (selection) 
  2016: Kenya, Nairobi Muralpainting

  2016: Tokyo, solo show

  2016: Amsterdam, GO Gallery -Groupshow

  2015: Ostrale Dresden, Germany

  2014: Rosenheim, Germany, Museum - Municipal Gallery

  2013: Völklingen, UrbanArt Biennale (Völklinger Hütte), Germany

  2013: Cologne, Germany, Art Cologne, 

  2012: Ludwigsburg, Germany, Kunstverein, 

  2011: Permm, Russia, Museum of Contemporary Art (Музей современного искусства)

  2009: Berlin, Germany, City Bath Wedding

  2009: Berlin, Germany. Urban Affairs/Tape-Art-World-Record

  2009: Hamburg,  Germany, Mono Concept

  2009: Karlsruhe,Germany, Art Karlsruhe

  2009: London, Bricklane Gallery

  2009: Sao Paulo, Brasilia, Red Bull "HOUSE OF ART

  2008: Berlin, Germany, Urban Affairs

  2008: Berlin, Germany, Sticker Museum

  2007: Naples, Italy, Bazar-one

References

Living people
Public art
German graffiti artists
Year of birth missing (living people)